Hawkvision was a short-lived subscription TV service founded by Wirtz Corporation and Chicago Blackhawks owner Bill Wirtz. The service broadcast Chicago Blackhawks games. It operated in conjunction with Chicago's local version of SportsChannel, and access cost $29.95 per month.

Overview
In 1992, Wirtz, who had a reputation for stubbornness and frugality, ended all Blackhawks broadcast agreements with network and cable television outlets. While vilified for this decision by many Blackhawks fans, he felt that broadcasting regular home games was unfair to the team's season-ticket holders. Only Blackhawks games picked up by national broadcasters (which only happened when the Blackhawks made the playoffs) were shown on basic cable (complicated further by SportsChannel America having various issues with carriage).

Hawkvision only broadcast for a short time, ending after the  season. However, regular Blackhawk home games did not resume airing on television until the  season after Wirtz's death. His son Rocky took over the team's operations and agreed to allow WGN-TV and NBC Sports Chicago to carry those games.

Similar subscription TV services were utilized for the Montreal Canadiens and Winnipeg Jets by rightsholder TSN from 2010 through 2014.

References 

American subscription television services
Television stations in Chicago
Television channels and stations established in 1992
1992 establishments in Illinois
Television channels and stations disestablished in 1995
1995 disestablishments in Illinois
Defunct television networks in the United States
SportsChannel
National Hockey League on television